Seirom is a dark ambient musical project started by Dutch multi-instrumentalist and composer Maurice de Jong, otherwise known as Mories. It was founded in 2011 and marked a stark contrast to de Jong's previous work, embracing a more ethereal sound.

History
The Seirom project was conceived in 2011 after composer Maurice de Jong had reached a creative exhaustive point with his other active projects. "I started to feel burned out. I think all the negativity (in my music making) kind of had an impact on me. I needed to do something positive." He independently released Eremitic on June 6, 2011. 1973 was released on November 9, 2012 and featured a lighter more positive tone compared to Seirom's debut. On May 1, 2014 the third full-length album And the Light Swallowed Everything was released and received positively, with Kez Whelan of Terrorizer describing the music as "hauntingly, harrowingly, luminously beautiful." Seirom's fourth album I Was So Sad was released on July 8, 2016.

Discography

 Eremitic (2011)
 1973 (2012)
 And the Light Swallowed Everything (2014)
 I Was So Sad (2016)

References

External links

Seirom at Bandcamp

Ambient music groups
Dark ambient music groups
Shoegazing musical groups
Musical groups established in 2011
Musical groups from Friesland
2011 establishments in the Netherlands